Niceforonia adenobrachia is a species of frog in the family Strabomantidae. It is endemic to the Cordillera Central, Colombia, in the Caldas and Tolima Departments.

Niceforonia adenobrachia occurs in sub-páramo and páramo habitats at  asl. It is threatened by burning of páramo for cattle grazing.

References

adenobrachia
Amphibians of the Andes
Amphibians of Colombia
Endemic fauna of Colombia
Taxonomy articles created by Polbot
Amphibians described in 1996